Locanda Locatelli is a restaurant owned by Italian chef Giorgio Locatelli and his wife, Plaxy. Located in the 5-star Churchill Hotel on Seymour Street in the West End of London, the restaurant specialises in Italian cuisine. It holds one Michelin star.

Description
Locanda Locatelli opened in February 2002. The restaurant serves traditional Italian dishes, with a particular emphasis on fresh pasta and regional Italian breads. There is also a variety of meat and fish dishes, as well as desserts. The restaurant was awarded a Michelin star in 2003, which it has retained every year since. A gas explosion occurred at the restaurant in November 2014, causing it to be closed for 4 months. 14 staff were injured and 400 people were evacuated. 6 fire engines and 35 firefighters attended the scene. The restaurant reopened on 14 March 2015. Reservations can only be made by phone.

References

External links
Official website

European restaurants in London
Italian restaurants in the United Kingdom
Michelin Guide starred restaurants in the United Kingdom